Hobulaiu is a village in Ridala Parish, Lääne County, in western Estonia, on the island Hobulaid.

References
 

Villages in Lääne County